Chilton Allen White (February 6, 1826 – December 7, 1900) was an American lawyer and politician. He was a Democrat and a U.S. Representative from Ohio from 1861 to 1865.

Early life and education
Born in Georgetown, Ohio, White attended the public schools and the subscription school run by his father, John D. White, where he befriended Ulysses Grant, a classmate. He taught school. He served in the Mexican–American War with Company G, First Regiment, Ohio Volunteers. He studied law.

Career
He was admitted to the bar in 1848 and commenced the practice of law in Georgetown, Ohio. He served as prosecuting attorney of Brown County from 1852 to 1854. He served as member of the Ohio Senate in 1859 and 1860.

White was elected as a Democrat to the Thirty-seventh and Thirty-eighth Congresses (March 4, 1861 – March 3, 1865). His vote on the Thirteenth Amendment is recorded as nay. He was an unsuccessful candidate for reelection in 1864 to the Thirty-ninth Congress.

During the American Civil War, he opposed the use of black soldiers by the U.S. Army, reportedly saying that "This is a Government of white men, made by white men for white men, to be administered, protected, defended, and maintained by white men."

He resumed the practice of law in Georgetown. He served as delegate to the State constitutional convention in 1873. He was an unsuccessful candidate for secretary of state in 1896.

Later life and death
He died in Georgetown, Ohio, December 7, 1900. He was interred in Confidence Cemetery.

References

External links

 
 

1826 births
1900 deaths
People from Georgetown, Ohio
Ohio lawyers
Democratic Party Ohio state senators
Ohio Constitutional Convention (1873)
County district attorneys in Ohio
American volunteer soldiers of the Mexican–American War
19th-century American politicians
19th-century American lawyers
Democratic Party members of the United States House of Representatives from Ohio